Ondu Cinema Kathe is a 1992 Indian Kannada-language film, directed by Phani Ramachandra and written by Shyamasundara Kulkarni. The film stars Ananth Nag, Anjana, Abhilasha and Mukhyamantri Chandru. The music was composed by Rajan–Nagendra and the dialogues were written by Chi. Udayashankar.

Cast
 Ananth Nag as Shyamsundar Kulkarni
 Anjana as Radha
 Abhilasha as Ganga
 Mukhyamantri Chandru as Film Producer
 Ramesh Bhat as Ramesh Bhat
 M. S. Umesh

Soundtrack
All songs were composed by Rajan–Nagendra for the lyrics of Chi. Udaya Shankar. The soundtrack was hugely successful upon release.

 "Kannada Honnudi" - S. P. Balasubrahmanyam. Lyrics : Shyamsundar Kulkarni
 "Ondu Mutthu"  - Narasimha Nayak, Manjula Gururaj
 "Olavina Prema Gange" - S. P. Balasubrahmanyam
 "Belli Belaku Moodide" - B. R. Chaya

References

External links 
 Thyview

1992 films
1990s Kannada-language films
Indian comedy films
Films scored by Rajan–Nagendra
Films directed by Phani Ramachandra